This is a list of sister cities in the United States. Sister cities, known in Europe as town twins, are cities which partner with each other to promote human contact and cultural links, although this partnering is not limited to cities and often includes counties, regions, states and other sub-national entities.

Many jurisdictions work with foreign cities through Sister Cities International, an organization whose goal is to "promote peace through mutual respect, understanding, and cooperation."

Alabama
Athens
 Stonehaven, Scotland, United Kingdom

Birmingham 

 Anshan, China
 Apaaso, Ghana
 Guédiawaye, Senegal
 Hitachi, Japan
 Al-Karak, Jordan
 Kingston, Jamaica
 Liverpool, England, United Kingdom
 Maebashi, Japan
 Plzeň, Czech Republic
 Rosh HaAyin, Israel
 Székesfehérvár, Hungary
 Vinnytsia, Ukraine
 Winneba, Ghana

Cullman
 Frankweiler, Germany

Huntsville
 Tainan, Taiwan

Mobile

 Ariel, West Bank
 Bolinao, Philippines
 Cockburn, Australia
 Constanța, Romania
 Gaeta, Italy
 Havana, Cuba
 Heze, China
 Ichihara, Japan
 iLembe, South Africa
 Katowice, Poland
 Košice, Slovakia
 Pyeongtaek, South Korea
 Tianjin, China
 Veracruz, Mexico
 Worms, Germany

Montevallo
 Echizen, Japan

Montgomery
 Pietrasanta, Italy

Tuscaloosa

 Narashino, Japan
 Schorndorf, Germany
 Sunyani, Ghana
 Techiman, Ghana

Alaska
Anchorage 

 Chitose, Japan
 Darwin, Australia
 Harbin, China
 Incheon, South Korea
 Magadan, Russia
 Tromsø, Norway
 Whitby, England, United Kingdom

Fairbanks 

 Erdenet, Mongolia
 Fanano, Italy
 Monbetsu, Japan
 Pune, India
 Tainan, Taiwan
 Yakutsk, Russia

Homer 

 Teshio, Japan
 Yelizovo, Russia

Juneau

 Kalibo, Philippines
 Whitehorse, Canada
 Vladivostok, Russia

Kenai
 Akita, Japan

Ketchikan

 Gero, Japan
 Prince Rupert, Canada

Nome
 Provideniya, Russia

Palmer
 Saroma, Japan

Seward
 Obihiro, Japan

Sitka
 Nemuro, Japan

Wasilla
 Uchiko, Japan

American Samoa

Arizona

Arkansas
Conway
 Quakenbrück, Germany

El Dorado
 Zentsūji, Japan

Fort Smith
 Cisterna di Latina, Italy

Gilbert
 Bride, Isle of Man

Hot Springs
 Hanamaki, Japan

Little Rock

 Caxias do Sul, Brazil
 Changchun, China
 Hanam, South Korea
 Kaohsiung, Taiwan
 Newcastle upon Tyne, England, United Kingdom

North Little Rock
 Uiwang, South Korea

Pine Bluff
 Bandō, Japan

Subiaco
 Subiaco, Australia

California

Colorado

Connecticut

Delaware
Wilmington

 Fulda, Germany
 Kalmar, Sweden
 Nemours, France
 Olevano sul Tusciano, Italy
 Osogbo, Nigeria
 Watford, England, United Kingdom

District of Columbia
Washington, D.C.

 Addis Ababa, Ethiopia
 Ankara, Turkey
 Athens, Greece
 Bangkok, Thailand
 Beijing, China
 Brussels, Belgium
 Dakar, Senegal
 Pretoria, South Africa
 Seoul, South Korea
 San Salvador, El Salvador
 Sunderland, England, United Kingdom

Florida

GeorgiaAthens Athens, Greece
 Cortona, Italy
 Iași, Romania
 Kamianets-Podilskyi, UkraineAtlanta Brussels, Belgium
 Bucharest, Romania
 Cotonou, Benin
 Daegu, South Korea
 Fukuoka, Japan
 Lagos, Nigeria
 Montego Bay, Jamaica
 Newcastle upon Tyne, England, United Kingdom
 Nuremberg, Germany
 Olympia, Greece
 Port of Spain, Trinidad and Tobago
 Ra'anana, Israel
 Rio de Janeiro, Brazil
 Salcedo, Dominican Republic
 Taipei, Taiwan
 Tbilisi, Georgia
 Toulouse, FranceAmericus Miyoshi, JapanAugusta Biarritz, France
 Takarazuka, JapanBrunswick Ganzhou, ChinaChamblee Kovel, UkraineCobb County Seongdong (Seoul), South KoreaColumbus Bistrița, Romania
 Kiryū, Japan
 Taichung, Taiwan
 Zugdidi, GeorgiaDalton Dilbeek, BelgiumDecatur Boussé, Burkina Faso
 Ouahigouya, Burkina Faso
 Trujillo, PeruHinesville Marsabit, Kenya
 Yichun, ChinaLaGrange Aso, Japan
 Craigavon, Northern Ireland, United Kingdom
 Poti, GeorgiaMacon Elmina, Ghana
 Kaohsiung, Taiwan
 Kurobe, Japan
 Mâcon, France
 Ulyanovsk, RussiaMarietta Heredia, Costa Rica
 Linz am Rhein, GermanyNewnan South Ayrshire, Scotland, United KingdomSavannah Batumi, Georgia
 Halle, Germany
 Jiujiang, China
 Kaya, Burkina Faso
 Patras, GreeceTifton Linyi, China

HawaiiHawaii County Cabugao, Philippines
 Gokseong, South Korea
 Kumejima, Japan
 Nago, Japan
 Ormoc, Philippines
 Ōshima, Japan
 Réunion, France
 La Serena, Chile
 Shibukawa, Japan
 Sumoto, Japan
 Yurihama, JapanHonolulu Baguio, Philippines
 Baku, Azerbaijan
 Bruyères, France
 Cali, Colombia
 Candon, Philippines
 Caracas, Venezuela
 Cebu City, Philippines
 Chengdu, China
 Chigasaki, Japan
 Fengxian (Shanghai), China
 Funchal, Portugal
 Fuzhou, China
 Haikou, China
 Noreña, Spain
 Hiroshima, Japan
 Huế, Vietnam
 Incheon, South Korea
 Kaohsiung, Taiwan
 Kyzyl, Russia
 Laoag, Philippines
 Majuro, Marshall Islands
 Mandaluyong, Philippines
 Manila, Philippines
 Mombasa, Kenya
 Mumbai, India
 Nagaoka, Japan
 Naha, Japan
 Qinhuangdao, China
 Rabat, Morocco
 San Juan, Puerto Rico
 Seoul, South Korea
 Sintra, Portugal
 Uwajima, Japan
 Vigan, Philippines
 Zhangzhou, China
 Zhongshan, ChinaKauai County Bangued, Philippines
 Davao City, Philippines
 Ishigaki, Japan
 Iwaki, Japan
 Laoag, Philippines
 Moriyama, Japan
 Papenoo, French Polynesia
 Santa, Philippines
 Suō-Ōshima, Japan
 Urdaneta, Philippines
 Whitby, England, United KingdomMaui County American Samoa
 Arequipa, Peru
 Bacarra, Philippines
 Badoc, Philippines
 Cabugao, Philippines
 Easter Island, Chile
 Embo, Scotland, United Kingdom
 Fukuyama, Japan
 Funchal, Portugal
 Goyang, South Korea
 Hachijō, Japan

 Manila, Philippines
 Pingtung, Taiwan
 Puerto Princesa, Philippines
 Quezon City, Philippines
 Saipan, Northern Mariana Islands
 San Juan, Philippines
 Santa, Philippines
 Sanya, China
 São Miguel Island, Portugal
 Sarrat, Philippines
 Zambales, Philippines

IdahoBoise Gernika-Lumo, SpainCoeur d'Alene Cranbrook, CanadaIdaho Falls Tōkai, JapanKetchum Lignano Sabbiadoro, Italy
 Tegernsee, GermanyMoscow Villa El Carmen, NicaraguaPocatello Iwamizawa, Japan
 Kwaremenguel, Burkina FasoSun Valley Kitzbühel, Austria
 Yamanouchi, Japan

Illinois

IndianaAnderson Bernburg, Germany
 Yuhang (Hangzhou), ChinaBloomington Posoltega, Nicaragua
 Santa Clara, CubaCarmel Kawachinagano, Japan
 Xiangyang, ChinaColumbus Löhne, Germany
 Miyoshi, Japan
 Pune, India
 Xiangyang, ChinaElkhart Burton upon Trent, England, United Kingdom
 Kardzhali, Bulgaria
 Tongxiang, ChinaEvansville Osnabrück, Germany
 Tizimín, Mexico
 Tochigi, JapanFishers Billericay, England, United KingdomFort Wayne Gera, Germany
 Płock, Poland
 Taizhou, China
 Takaoka, JapanFranklin Kuji, JapanGary Fuxin, ChinaGoshen Bexbach, GermanyGreenfield Kakuda, JapanHammond Galați, Romania
 Shahe, ChinaIndianapolis Campinas, Brazil
 Cologne, Germany
 Hangzhou, China
 Hyderabad, India
 Monza, Italy
 Northamptonshire, England, United Kingdom
 Onitsha, Nigeria
 Piran, Slovenia
 Taipei, TaiwanJasper Pfaffenweiler, GermanyKokomo Dongyang, ChinaLa Porte Grangemouth, Scotland, United KingdomLafayette Longkou, China
 Ōta, JapanMishawaka Shiojiri, JapanMuncie Changhua, Taiwan
 Deyang, China
 Isparta, Turkey
 Taraz, Kazakhstan
 Zhuji, ChinaNewburgh Newburgh, England, United KingdomNoblesville Cittadella, Italy
 Nova Prata, BrazilRichmond Serpukhov, Russia
 Unnan, JapanShelbyville Shizuoka, JapanSouth Bend Arzberg, Germany
 Częstochowa, Poland
 Guanajuato, MexicoTerre Haute Tajimi, Japan
 Tambov, RussiaTippecanoe County Ōta, JapanVincennes Vincennes, France
 Wasserburg am Inn, GermanyWest Lafayette Ōta, Japan

IowaCedar Falls Ferizaj, KosovoCedar Rapids Tangshan, ChinaClarinda Tamana, JapanCouncil Bluffs El Hajeb, Morocco
 Herat, Afghanistan
 Kandahar, Afghanistan
 Karrada (Baghdad), Iraq
 Tobolsk, RussiaDavenport County Carlow, Ireland
 Ilhéus, Brazil
 Kaiserslautern, GermanyDes Moines Kōfu, Japan
 Pristina, Kosovo
 Saint-Étienne, France
 Shijiazhuang, China
 Stavropol, RussiaDeWitt Bredstedt, GermanyDubuque Dornbirn, Austria
 Handan, China
 Pyatigorsk, RussiaEldridge Schönberg, GermanyElkader Mascara, AlgeriaFort Dodge Gjakova, KosovoFort Madison Prüm, GermanyJohnston Peja, KosovoLaurens Laurens, FranceMarshalltown Budyonnovsk, Russia
 Minami-Alps, JapanMason City Montegrotto Terme, ItalyMuscatine Drohobych, Ukraine
 Ichikawamisato, Japan
 Kislovodsk, Russia
 Łomża, Poland
 Ludwigslust, Germany

 Ramallah, Palestine
 Zhengding, ChinaNewton Smila, Ukraine
 Wuqi (Taichung), TaiwanNorwalk Vushtrri, KosovoOrange City Shibata, JapanOsage Lermontov, RussiaShenandoah Tisovec, SlovakiaSioux City Gjilan, Kosovo
 Lake Charles, United States
 Yamanashi, JapanStorm Lake Ayotlán, MexicoWalcott Bredenbek, GermanyWaterloo Giessen, GermanyWaverly Eisenach, GermanyWest Des Moines Mateh Asher, IsraelWinterset Minami-Alps, Japan

KansasAbilene
 Omitama, Japan

Hays

 Santa María de Fe, Paraguay
 Xinzheng, China

Kansas City

 Karlovac, Croatia
 Limerick, Ireland
 Linz, Austria
 Uruapan, Mexico

Lawrence

 Eutin, Germany
 Hiratsuka, Japan
 Oiniades, Greece

Leavenworth

 Omihachiman, Japan
 Wagga Wagga, Australia

Lindsborg
 Munkfors, Sweden

Manhattan
 Dobřichovice, Czech Republic

Olathe

 Ocotlán, Mexico

Overland Park
 Bietigheim-Bissingen, Germany

Prairie Village
 Dolyna, Ukraine

Shawnee

 Erfurt, Germany
 Listowel, Ireland 
 Pittem, Belgium

Wichita

 Benito Juárez, Mexico
 Kaifeng, China
 Orléans, France
 Tlalnepantla de Baz, Mexico

Kentucky
Bardstown
 Billom, France

Bowling Green
 Kawanishi, Japan

Campbellsville
 Buncrana, Ireland

Danville
 Carrickfergus, Northern Ireland, United Kingdom

Elizabethtown
 Koori, Japan

Frankfort
 Shimamoto, Japan

Georgetown
 Tahara, Japan

Hopkinsville
 Carentan-les-Marais, France

Lexington

 Deauville, France
 County Kildare, Ireland
 Newmarket, England, United Kingdom
 Shinhidaka, Japan

Louisville

 Adapazarı, Turkey
 Jiujiang, China

 Mainz, Germany
 Montpellier, France
 Perm, Russia
 La Plata, Argentina
 Quito, Ecuador
 Tamale, Ghana

Madison County
 Hokuto, Japan

Morehead

 Ballymena, Northern Ireland, United Kingdom
 Yangshuo, China

Morgantown
 Nanao, Japan

Owensboro

 Nisshin, Japan
 Olomouc, Czech Republic

Paris
 Lamotte-Beuvron, France

Pikeville
 Dundalk, Ireland

Radcliff
 Munster, Germany

Shelbyville
 Bitburg, Germany

Louisiana
Arnaudville
 Jausiers, France

Baton Rouge

 Aix-en-Provence, France
 Córdoba, Mexico
 Malatya, Turkey
 Taichung, Taiwan

Crowley
 Vaux-sur-Sûre, Belgium

Gonzales
 Meylan, France

Hammond
 Jouars-Pontchartrain, France

Lafayette

 Agnibilékrou, Ivory Coast
 Le Cannet, France
 Centla, Mexico
 Longueuil, Canada
 Moncton,  Canada
 Namur, Belgium
 Poitiers, France

Napoleonville
 Pontivy, France

Natchitoches
 La Roque-d'Anthéron, France

New Orleans

 Cap-Haïtien, Haiti
 Caracas, Venezuela
 Durban, South Africa
 Innsbruck, Austria
 Isola del Liri, Italy
 Juan-les-Pins (Antibes), France
 Maracaibo, Venezuela
 Matsue, Japan
 Mérida, Mexico
 Orléans, France
 Pointe-Noire, Congo
 San Miguel de Tucumán, Argentina
 Tegucigalpa, Honduras

Shreveport
 Ostrava, Czech Republic

St. Martinville

 Bouctouche, Canada
 Chaudfontaine, Belgium
 Gorée, Senegal
 Madawaska, United States

Thibodaux
 Loudun, France

Maine

Maryland

Massachusetts

Michigan

Minnesota
Bloomington
 Izumi, Japan

Brainerd
 Leksand, Sweden

Cambridge

 Beli Manastir, Croatia
 Rättvik, Sweden
 Yuasa, Japan

Columbia Heights
 Łomianki, Poland

Duluth

 Isumi, Japan
 Petrozavodsk, Russia
 Ranya, Iraq
 Thunder Bay, Canada
 Växjö, Sweden

Elbow Lake
 Flekkefjord, Norway

Fergus Falls
 Nordhordland, Norway

Fridley
 Fourmies, France

Hibbing
 Walsrode, Germany

Lindström
 Tingsryd, Sweden

Little Canada
 Thunder Bay, Canada

Little Falls
 Le Bourget, France

Melrose
 Legden, Germany

Minneapolis

 Bosaso, Somalia
 Cuernavaca, Mexico
 Eldoret, Kenya
 Harbin, China
 Ibaraki, Japan
 Kuopio, Finland
 Najaf, Iraq
 Novosibirsk, Russia
 Santiago, Chile
 Tours, France
 Uppsala, Sweden
 Winnipeg, Canada

Montevideo
 Montevideo, Uruguay

Mora
 Mora, Sweden

New Ulm
 Neu-Ulm, Germany

Paynesville
 Paynesville, Liberia

Red Wing

 Ikata, Japan
 Quzhou, China

Rochester

 Kathmandu, Nepal
 Moosburg an der Isar, Germany
 Siheung, South Korea
 Xianyang, China

Saint Paul

 Changsha, China
 Ciudad Romero (Jiquilisco), El Salvador
 Culiacán, Mexico
 Djibouti City, Djibouti
 George, South Africa
 Manzanillo, Mexico
 Modena, Italy
 Mogadishu, Somalia
 Nagasaki, Japan
 Neuss, Germany
 Novosibirsk, Russia
 Tiberias, Israel

Saint Peter
 Petatlán, Mexico

Shoreview
 Einhausen, Germany

St. Anthony
 Salo, Finland

St. Cloud

 Akita, Japan
 Saint-Cloud, France
 Spalt, Germany

Winona

 Bytów, Poland
 Misato, Japan

Worthington
 Crailsheim, Germany

Mississippi
Clarksdale
 Notodden, Norway

Clinton
 Zarafshan, Uzbekistan

Jackson

 Kahramanmaraş, Turkey
 M'Bour, Senegal

Madison
 Sollefteå, Sweden

Oxford
 Aubigny-sur-Nère, France

Missouri
Cape Girardeau
 Shaoxing, China

Columbia

 Hakusan, Japan
 Kutaisi, Georgia
 Laoshan (Qingdao), China
 Sibiu, Romania
 Suncheon, South Korea

Hermann
 Bad Arolsen, Germany

Independence
 Higashimurayama, Japan

Jefferson City
 Münchberg, Germany

Joplin
 Bethlehem, Palestine

Kansas City

 Arusha, Tanzania
 Freetown, Sierra Leone
 Guadalajara, Mexico

 Kurashiki, Japan
 Morelia, Mexico
 Port Harcourt, Nigeria
 Ramla, Israel
 Seville, Spain
 Tainan, Taiwan
 Xi'an, China
 Yan'an, China

Lee's Summit
 Aizuwakamatsu, Japan

Liberty
 Diekirch, Luxembourg 

Neosho
 Pohnpei, Micronesia

Rolla
 Sondershausen, Germany

Springfield

 Isesaki, Japan
 Tlaquepaque, Mexico

St. Charles

 Carndonagh, Ireland
 Ludwigsburg, Germany

St. James
 Shibata, Japan

St. Louis

 Bologna, Italy
 Bogor, Indonesia
 Brčko, Bosnia and Herzegovina
 County Donegal, Ireland
 Galway, Ireland
 Georgetown, Guyana
 Lyon, France
 Nanjing, China
 Rosario, Argentina
 Saint-Louis, Senegal
 Samara, Russia
 San Luis Potosí, Mexico
 Stuttgart, Germany
 Suwa, Japan
 Szczecin, Poland

Washington
 Marbach am Neckar, Germany

Montana
Bozeman
 Mörön, Mongolia

Butte
 Altensteig, Germany

Great Falls
 Lethbridge, Canada

Helena
 Isla Mujeres, Mexico

Livingston
 Naganohara, Japan

Havre
 Maple Creek, Canada

Missoula

 Neckargemünd, Germany
 Palmerston North, New Zealand

Nebraska
Boys Town
 Ballymoe, Ireland

Chadron
 Přeštice, Czech Republic

Gering
 Bamyan, Afghanistan

Kearney

 Dourados, Brazil
 Opava, Czech Republic

Lincoln
 Khujand, Tajikistan

Omaha

 Braunschweig, Germany
 Naas, Ireland
 Shizuoka, Japan
 Šiauliai, Lithuania
 Xalapa, Mexico
 Yantai, China

Scottsbluff

 Bamyan, Afghanistan
 Galați, Romania

Stromsburg
 Ockelbo, Sweden

Wilber
 Telč, Czech Republic

Nevada
Fallon
 Vani, Georgia

Las Vegas

 Angeles City, Philippines
 Ansan, South Korea
 Huludao, China
 Phuket, Thailand

Reno

 Hatzor HaGlilit, Israel
 San Sebastián, Spain
 Taichung, Taiwan
 Udon Thani, Thailand
 Wirral, England, United Kingdom

Tonopah
 Kéniéba, Mali

New Hampshire

New Jersey
Atlantic City

 Cabourg, France
 Zhanjiang, China

Belmar
 Balbriggan, Ireland

Bridgeton
 Eskilstuna, Sweden

Elizabeth
 Kitami, Japan

Evesham
 Evesham, England, United Kingdom

Hackensack
 Passau, Germany

Hackettstown
 Hacketstown, Ireland

Jersey City

 Ahmedabad, India
 Changwon, South Korea 
 Cusco, Peru
 Gomoa West District, Ghana
 Indrawati, Nepal
 Jerusalem, Israel
 Karpathos, Greece
 Kolkata, India
 Nantong, China
 New Delhi, India
 Oviedo, Spain
 Ozamiz, Philippines
 Palatka, United States
 Saint John's, Antigua and Barbuda
 Sant'Arsenio, Italy

Lakewood
 Bnei Brak, Israel

Lyndhurst
 Kukës, Albania

Marlboro

 Nanto, Japan
 Wujiang (Suzhou), China

Montclair

 Aquilonia, Italy
 Barnet, England, United Kingdom
 Cherepovets, Russia
 Graz, Austria

Newark

 Banjul, The Gambia
 Belo Horizonte, Brazil
 Cuenca, Ecuador
 Douala, Cameroon
 Freeport, Bahamas
 Ganja, Azerbaijan
 Governador Valadares, Brazil
 Kumasi, Ghana
 Monrovia, Liberia
 Porto Alegre, Brazil
 Reserva, Brazil
 Rio de Janeiro, Brazil

 Umuaka, Nigeria
 Xuzhou, China

New Brunswick

 Debrecen, Hungary
 Fukui, Japan
 County Limerick, Ireland
 Tsuruoka, Japan

Perth Amboy
 Caldas da Rainha, Portugal

Princeton
 Colmar, France

Tewksbury
 Tewkesbury, England, United Kingdom

Toms River
 Matera, Italy

Trenton
 Jundiaí, Brazil

Woodbury
 Bury, England, United Kingdom

New Mexico
Albuquerque

 Alburquerque, Spain
 Ashgabat, Turkmenistan
 Chihuahua, Mexico
 Guadalajara, Mexico
 Helmstedt, Germany
 Hualien, Taiwan
 Lanzhou, China
 Lusaka, Zambia
 Rehovot, Israel
 Sasebo, Japan

Angel Fire
 Quảng Trị, Vietnam

Clovis
 Kasama, Zambia

Las Cruces

 Lerdo, Mexico
 Nienburg, Germany

Los Alamos
 Sarov, Russia

Magdalena
 San Pedro de Atacama, Chile

Ruidoso
 Puerto Peñasco, Mexico

Santa Fe

 Bukhara, Uzbekistan
 Hidalgo del Parral, Mexico
 Holguín, Cuba
 Icheon, South Korea
 Livingstone, Zambia
 San Miguel de Allende, Mexico
 Santa Fe, Spain
 Sorrento, Italy
 Tsuyama, Japan
 Zhangjiajie, China

New York

North Carolina

North Dakota
Fargo

 Hamar, Norway
 Martin, Slovakia

Grand Forks
 Sarpsborg, Norway

Minot
 Skien, Norway

Northern Mariana Islands

Ohio

Oklahoma
Edmond

 Engels, Russia
 Qingyang, China

Enid
 Kollo, Niger

Lawton
 Güllesheim, Germany

Norman

 Arezzo, Italy
 Clermont-Ferrand, France
 Colima, Mexico
 Seika, Japan

Oklahoma City

 Haikou, China
 Kigali, Rwanda
 Piura, Peru
 Puebla, Mexico
 Rio de Janeiro, Brazil
 Tainan, Taiwan
 Taipei, Taiwan
 Ulyanovsk, Russia

Owasso
 Chaumont, France

Pawhuska
 Montauban, France

Ponca City
 Baiyin, China

Shawnee
 Nikaho, Japan

Stillwater

 Gədəbəy, Azerbaijan
 Kameoka, Japan

Tulsa

 Amiens, France
 Celle, Germany
 Beihai, China
 Kaohsiung, Taiwan
 San Luis Potosí, Mexico
 Tiberias, Israel
 Utsunomiya, Japan
 Zelenograd, Russia

Oregon
Ashland
 Guanajuato, Mexico

Astoria
 Walldorf, Germany

Beaverton

 Birobidzhan, Russia
 Cheonan, South Korea
 Cluses, France
 Gotemba, Japan
 Hsinchu, Taiwan
 Trossingen, Germany

Boring

 Bland, Australia
 Dull, Scotland, United Kingdom

Corvallis

 Gondar, Ethiopia
 Uzhhorod, Ukraine

Eugene

 Irkutsk, Russia
 Jinju, South Korea
 Kakegawa, Japan
 Kathmandu, Nepal

Florence
 Yamagata, Japan

Forest Grove
 Nyūzen, Japan

Grants Pass
 Rubtsovsk, Russia

Gresham

 Ebetsu, Japan
 Owerri, Nigeria
 Sokcho, South Korea

Hillsboro

 Fukuroi, Japan
 Krapkowice, Poland
 Morawica, Poland
 Zabierzów, Poland

Hood River
 Tsuruta, Japan

Klamath Falls
 Rotorua Lakes, New Zealand

Lake Oswego
 Yoshikawa, Japan

Madras
 Tōmi, Japa

Medford
 Alba, Italy

Newberg
 Asago, Japan

Newport
 Mombetsu, Japan

Ontario
 Ōsakasayama, Japan

Oregon City
 Tateshina, Japan

Portland

 Ashkelon, Israel
 Bologna, Italy
 Guadalajara, Mexico
 Kaohsiung, Taiwan
 Khabarovsk, Russia
 Mutare, Zimbabwe
 Sapporo, Japan
 Suzhou, China
 Ulsan, South Korea

Roseburg

 Aranda de Duero, Spain
 Kuki, Japan

Salem

 Gimhae, South Korea
 Kawagoe, Japan

The Dalles
 Miyoshi, Japan

Pennsylvania

Puerto Rico

Rhode Island

South Carolina
Anderson
 Carrickfergus, Northern Ireland, United Kingdom

Charleston

 Doha, Qatar
 Freetown, Sierra Leone
 Panama City, Panama
 Speightstown, Barbados
 Spoleto, Italy

Clover
 Larne, Northern Ireland, United Kingdom

Columbia

 Accra, Ghana
 Chelyabinsk, Russia
 Cluj-Napoca, Romania
 Kaiserslautern, Germany
 Plovdiv, Bulgaria
 Taichung, Taiwan
 Yibin, China

Greenville

 Bergamo, Italy
 Kortrijk, Belgium
 Tianjin Free-Trade Zone, China
 Vadodara, India

Myrtle Beach

 Keighley, England, United Kingdom
 Killarney, Ireland
 Pinamar, Argentina

Pendleton
 Stornoway, Scotland, United Kingdom

South Dakota
Rapid City

 Apolda, Germany
 Nikkō, Japan

Sioux Falls

 Newry, Mourne and Down, Northern Ireland, United Kingdom
 Potsdam, Germany

Vermillion
 Ratingen, Germany

Tennessee
Athens
 Isahaya, Japan

Chattanooga

 Gangneung, South Korea
 Givatayim, Israel
 Hamm, Germany
 Nizhny Tagil, Russia
 Tōno, Japan

 Wuxi, China

Franklin

 Bad Soden, Germany
 Carleton Place, Canada
 County Laois, Ireland

Germantown
 Königs Wusterhausen, Germany

Hendersonville
 Tsuru, Japan

Johnson City

 Guaranda, Ecuador
 Ronneby, Sweden
 Rybinsk, Russia
 Teterow, Germany

Knoxville

 Chełm, Poland
 Kaohsiung, Taiwan
 Larissa, Greece
 Muroran, Japan
 Yesan, South Korea

La Vergne
 La Vergne, France

McMinnville
 Mikawa, Japan

Memphis

 Kanifing, Gambia
 Shoham, Israel

Nashville

 Belfast, Northern Ireland, United Kingdom
 Caen, France
 Chengdu, China
 Edmonton, Canada

 Magdeburg, Germany
 Mendoza, Argentina
 Taiyuan, China
 Tamworth, Australia

Oak Ridge

 Naka, Japan
 Obninsk, Russia

Smyrna
 Zama, Japan

Texas

Utah
Cedar City
 Gapyeong, South Korea

Magna
 Yuzawa, Japan

Midway
 Trubschachen, Switzerland

Murray
 Chiayi, Taiwan

Ogden
 Hof, Germany

Orem
 Ürümqi, China

Park City
 Courchevel, France

Provo

 Meissen, Germany
 Nanning, China

Salt Lake City

 Chernivtsi, Ukraine
 Izhevsk, Russia
 Keelung, Taiwan
 Matsumoto, Japan
 Turin, Italy 

Sandy

 Piedras Negras, Mexico
 Riesa, Germany

St. George
 Ibigawa, Japan

Tooele
 Kambarka, Russia

West Valley City

 Boca del Río, Mexico
 Nantou, Taiwan

Vermont

Virginia
Alexandria

 Caen, France
 Dundee, Scotland, United Kingdom
 Helsingborg, Sweden

Arlington County

 Aachen, Germany
 Coyoacán (Mexico City), Mexico
 Ivano-Frankivsk, Ukraine
 Reims, France
 San Miguel, El Salvador

Chesapeake
 Joinville, Brazil

Charlottesville

 Besançon, France
 Pleven, Bulgaria
 Poggio a Caiano, Italy
 Winneba, Ghana

Chesterfield County
 Gravesham, England, United Kingdom

Fairfax County

 Harbin, China
 Keçiören, Turkey
 Songpa (Seoul), South Korea

Fredericksburg

 Este, Italy
 Fréjus, France
 Kathmandu, Nepal
 Princes Town, Ghana
 Schwetzingen, Germany

Gordonsville
 Thoré-la-Rochette, France

Hampton

 Anyang, South Korea
 Msunduzi, South Africa
 Southampton, England, United Kingdom
 Vendôme, France

Herndon
 Runnymede, England, United Kingdom

Hopewell
 Ashford, England, United Kingdom

Jamestown

 Lyme Regis, England, United Kingdom
 St. George's, Bermuda

Leesburg
 Samcheok, South Korea

Loudoun County

 Goyang, South Korea
 Karşıyaka, Turkey
 Main-Taunus (district), Germany
 New Taipei, Taiwan
 Shunyi (Beijing), China

Lynchburg

 Glauchau, Germany
 Rueil-Malmaison, France

Newport News

 Greifswald, Germany
 Neyagawa, Japan
 Taizhou, China

Norfolk

 Cagayan de Oro, Philippines
 Halifax, Canada
 Kaliningrad, Russia
 Kitakyushu, Japan
 Kochi, India
 Norfolk, England, United Kingdom
 Tema, Ghana
 Toulon, France
 Wilhelmshaven, Germany

Portsmouth

 Dunedin, New Zealand
 Eldoret, Kenya
 Portsmouth, England, United Kingdom

Richmond

 Richmond upon Thames, England, United Kingdom
 Saitama, Japan
 Ségou, Mali
 Windhoek, Namibia
 Zhengzhou, China

Roanoke

 Florianópolis, Brazil
 Kisumu, Kenya
 Lijiang, China
 Opole, Poland
 Pskov, Russia
 Saint-Lô, France
 Wonju, South Korea

Stafford County
 Stafford, England, United Kingdom

Suffolk

 Oderzo, Italy
 Suffolk, England, United Kingdom

Virginia Beach

 Ards and North Down, Northern Ireland, United Kingdom
 Miyazaki, Japan
 Moss, Norway
 Olongapo, Philippines
 Waiblingen, Germany

Winchester
 Winchester, England, United Kingdom

Wise
 Çeşme, Turkey

Yorktown

 Port-Vendres, France
 Zweibrücken, Germany

Washington

West Virginia
Charleston
 Banská Bystrica, Slovakia

Harpers Ferry
 Chatham-Kent, Canada

Morgantown

 Guanajuato, Mexico
 Quanshan (Xuzhou), China

Princeton
 Yoshkar-Ola, Russia

Wisconsin
Appleton

 Chinandega, Nicaragua
 Kanonji, Japan
 Kurgan, Russia

Brookfield
 Seligenstadt, Germany

Crivitz
 Crivitz, Germany

De Pere
 Åmål, Sweden

Dodgeville
 Oakham, England, United Kingdom

Door County
 Jingdezhen, China

Eau Claire
 Lismore, Australia

Hayward
 Lillehammer, Norway

Green Bay
 Irapuato, Mexico

Kenosha

 Cosenza, Italy
 Douai, France
 Quezon City, Philippines
 Wolfenbüttel, Germany

La Crosse

 Bantry, Ireland
 Dubna, Russia
 Épinal, France
 Friedberg, Germany
 Kumba, Cameroon
 Luoyang, China

Madison

 Arcatao, El Salvador
 Bahir Dar, Ethiopia
 Camagüey, Cuba
 Freiburg im Breisgau, Germany
 Kanifing, Gambia
 Mantua, Italy
 Obihiro, Japan
 Tepatitlán de Morelos, Mexico
 Vilnius, Lithuania

Manitowoc
 Kamogawa, Japan

Marshfield

 Jáuregui, Argentina
 Zhangjiagang, China

Menomonie

 Konakovo, Russia
 Nasukarasuyama, Japan

Milwaukee

 Bomet, Kenya
 Daegu, South Korea
 Galway, Ireland
 Irpin, Ukraine
 King Cetshwayo, South Africa
 Medan, Indonesia
 Tarime District, Tanzania
 Zadar, Croatia

Mineral Point
 Redruth, England, United Kingdom

New London
 Killaloe, Ireland

Oconomowoc
 Dietzenbach, Germany

Port Washington
 Sassnitz, Germany

Racine

 Aalborg, Denmark
 Montélimar, France
 Ōiso, Japan
 Zapotlanejo, Mexico

Rice Lake

 Miharu, Japan
 Žamberk, Czech Republic

Richland Center

 Santa Teresa, Nicaragua
 Yueqing, China

Sheboygan

 Esslingen am Neckar, Germany
 Tsubame, Japan

Stevens Point

 Gulcz (Wieleń), Poland
 Rostov, Russia

Stoughton
 Gjøvik, Norway

Superior
 Ami, Japan

Two Rivers
 Domažlice, Czech Republic

Waukesha  
 Kokshetau, Kazakhstan

Waupaca

 Mitoyo, Japan

West Bend

 Aishō, Japan
 Heppenheim, Germany
 Pazardzhik, Bulgaria

Wisconsin Dells
 Iwaizumi, Japan

Wyoming
Cheyenne

 Accra, Ghana
 Bismarck, United States
 Hammam Sousse, Tunisia
 Lompoc, United States

 Voghera, Italy
 Taichung, Taiwan
 Waimea, United States

Gillette
 Yulin, China

Jackson
 Lienz, Austria

References

 
Foreign relations of the United States
United States geography-related lists
Cities in the United States
Populated places in the United States